Ilex tahanensis is a species of plant in the family Aquifoliaceae. It is a tree endemic to Peninsular Malaysia.

References

tahanensis
Endemic flora of Peninsular Malaysia
Trees of Peninsular Malaysia
Conservation dependent plants
Near threatened flora of Asia
Taxonomy articles created by Polbot